Robert Hammond  (born 1981) is an Australian field hockey player from Queensland.  He has played hockey on the state level.  He has been a consistent member of the Australia men's national field hockey team.  He was with the team when they won a gold medal at the 2004 Summer Olympics and a bronze medal at the 2008 Summer Olympics.  He is competing for a spot on the team to represent the country at the 2012 Summer Olympics.  He was also a member of the team that won a gold medal at the 2010 Men's Hockey Champions Trophy.

Personal
Hammond was born in 1981 in Queensland.

Field hockey
In 1999, Hammond had a scholarship with and played for the Australian Institute of Sport team. He has represented his state in the Australian Hockey League, playing for them in the final game of the 2010 season.

National team
Hammond is a member of the Australia men's national field hockey team. In 2007, he did not compete in the Oceania Olympic qualifying tournament. In December 2007, Hammond played Kookaburras squad that competed in the Dutch Series in Canberra. In 2006, he represented Australia at the Azlan Shah tournament in Malaysia. In 2007, he was injured and not able to play for Australia.  He was temporarily replaced on the roster by Kiel Brown. In January 2008, he was a member of the senior national team that competed at the Five Nations men's hockey tournament in South Africa. New national team coach Ric Charlesworth named him, a returning member, alongside fourteen total new players who had few than 10 national team caps to the squad before in April 2009 in a bid to ready the team for the 2010 Commonwealth Games. In 2009, he was a member of the national team during a five-game test series in Kuala Lumpur, Malaysia against Malaysia. He was on the squad in 2010. That year, he was a member of the team that finished first at the Hockey Champions Trophy. In 2010, he was part of the team that won the World Cup in India. He and Kiel Brown were considered by team coaches as one of the major contributors to the team in helping them secure their medal.

Olympics
Hammond won a gold medal at the 2004 Summer Olympics and a bronze medal at the 2008 Summer Olympics. He scored a goal in the bronze medal game against the Netherlands in the country's 6–1 victory. In December 2011, he was named as one of twenty-eight players to be on the 2012 Summer Olympics Australian men's national training squad. This squad will be narrowed in June 2012.  He trained with the team from 18 January to mid-March in Perth, Western Australia. In February during the training camp, he played in a four nations test series with the teams being the Kookaburras, Australia A Squad, the Netherlands and Argentina. He played for the Australian A team in their 3–1 loss to the Kookaburras in the first round of the competition. He is one of several Queensland based players likely to play in a three-game test series to be played in Cairns, Queensland from 22 to 25 June against the New Zealand's Black Stickss. Final Olympic section will occur several days before this test and his inclusion in the series will be contingent upon being selected.

In the 2005 Australia Day Honours Hammond was awarded the Medal of the Order of Australia (OAM).

Professional hockey
In 2010 and 2011, he played professional hockey in the Netherlands for Oranje Zwart.

References

External links
 

1981 births
Australian male field hockey players
Olympic field hockey players of Australia
Olympic gold medalists for Australia
Olympic bronze medalists for Australia
Field hockey players at the 2004 Summer Olympics
Field hockey players at the 2008 Summer Olympics
2006 Men's Hockey World Cup players
2010 Men's Hockey World Cup players
2014 Men's Hockey World Cup players
Field hockey players at the 2006 Commonwealth Games
Field hockey players at the 2010 Commonwealth Games
Recipients of the Medal of the Order of Australia
Living people
Commonwealth Games gold medallists for Australia
Sportspeople from Townsville
Olympic medalists in field hockey
Medalists at the 2008 Summer Olympics
Medalists at the 2004 Summer Olympics
Commonwealth Games medallists in field hockey
Oranje Zwart players
Expatriate field hockey players
Australian expatriate sportspeople in the Netherlands
Hockey India League players
Sportsmen from Queensland
Field hockey people from Queensland
Medallists at the 2006 Commonwealth Games
Medallists at the 2010 Commonwealth Games